The Naturalization Act of 1870 was a United States federal law that created a system of controls for the naturalization process and penalties for fraudulent practices.  It is also noted for extending the naturalization process to "aliens of African nativity and to persons of African descent" while also maintaining exclusion of the process to naturalized Chinese Americans and other groups.

Wong Kim Ark case
By virtue of the Fourteenth Amendment and despite the 1870 Act, the Supreme Court in United States v. Wong Kim Ark (1898) recognized U.S. birthright citizenship of an American-born child of Chinese parents who had a permanent domicile and residence in the United States, and who were there carrying on business, and were not employed in any diplomatic or official capacity under the Emperor of China. U.S. citizenship of persons born in the United States since Wong Kim Ark have been recognized, although the Supreme Court has never directly made a ruling in relation to children born to parents who are not legal residents in the United States.

Legislative history
The Naturalization bill was introduced by Republican Representative Noah Davis from New York in the House of Representatives as bill H.R. 2201 and Republican Senator Roscoe Conkling from New York co-sponsored the bill in the Senate.  

The 1870 Act was passed by the 41st United States Congress and signed into law by President Ulysses S. Grant on July 14, 1870. Although the act was enacted in the United States Congress during the Reconstruction era, it is often not noted among the group of major legislative bills passed and enacted during that time period.

References

Bibliography
 Provides a brief overview of the importance of the Naturalization Act of 1870 among Congressmen during the era of Reconstruction.  It also traces the legislative history of bill H.R. 2201 in Congress during 1870.

1870 in American law
1870 in the United States
Legislation
Presidency of Ulysses S. Grant
Reconstruction Era legislation
United States federal immigration and nationality legislation
Asian-American issues